The New Siberian Islands are an archipelago in the Extreme North of Russia, to the north of the East Siberian coast between the Laptev Sea and the East Siberian Sea north of the Sakha (Yakutia) Republic.

History
 
The first news about the existence of the New Siberian Islands was brought by a Cossack, Yakov Permyakov, in the beginning of the 18th century. In 1712, a Cossack unit led by M. Vagin reached the Great Lyakhovsky Island.

In 1809–10 Yakov Sannikov and Matvei Gedenschtrom went to the New Siberian Islands on a cartographic expedition. Sannikov reported the sighting of a "new land" north of Kotelny in 1811. This became the myth of Zemlya Sannikova or Sannikov Land. In 1886, Russian polar explorer and scientist Eduard Toll, during his first visit to the New Siberian Islands, thought that he had seen an unknown land north of Kotelny Island. He guessed that this was the so-called Zemlya Sannikova.

Toll paid a further visit to the island group in the spring of 1892, accompanied by one Cossack and three natives. He traveled over the ice in sleds drawn by dogs and reached the south coast of Great Lyakhovsky Island. These sediments are cemented by permafrost and have accumulated periodically over the last 200,000 years.

In September 2014, the Russian Navy re-established a Soviet era naval base on Kotelny Island which had lain abandoned since 1993.

Geography

The New Siberian Islands proper, or Anzhu Islands (острова Анжу, Sakha: Анжу арыылара), covering a land area of about 29,000 km, consist of:
 Kotelny Island (о. Коте́льный) 11,700 km and
 Faddeyevsky Island (о. Фадде́евский) 5,300 km. Bunge Land (земля́ Бу́нге) 6,200 km (occasionally submerged by sea) links Kotelny Island and Faddeyevsky Island. Very close to Bunge Land's northwestern coast lie two smaller islands: 
 Zheleznyakov Island (Ostrov Zheleznyakova), right off the NW cape and east of it, Matar Island (Ostrov Matar). Both islands have a length of about 5 km.
 Nanosnyy Island  is a small island located due north off the northern bay formed by Kotelny and Bunge. It is C-shaped and only 4 km in length, but its importance lies in the fact that it is the northernmost island of the New Siberian group.
 Novaya Sibir (о. Но́вая Сиби́рь) 6,200 km
 Belkovsky Island (о. Бельковский) 500 km

To the south and nearer to the Siberian mainland lie the Lyakhovskiye Islands (6,095 km):

 Great Lyakhovsky Island (о. Большо́й Ля́ховский) 4,600 km
 Little Lyakhovsky Island (о. Ма́лый Ля́ховский) 1,325 km
 Stolbovoy Island (о. Столбово́й) 170 km
 Semyonovsky Island (о. Семёновский) 0 km (now submerged)

The small De Long Islands (228 km) lie to the north-east of Novaya Sibir.
 Jeannette Island (о. Жанне́тты)
 Henrietta Island (о. Генрие́тты)
 Bennett Island (о. Бе́ннетта)
 Vilkitsky Island (о. Вильки́цкого)
 Zhokhov Island (о. Жо́хова)

The New Siberian Islands are low-lying. Their highest point is located on Bennett island, with an elevation of 426 m. They are part of the East Siberian Lowland, forming a geographical continuum with the continental plains further south.

The New Siberian Islands once formed major hills within the Great Arctic Plain that covered the northern part of Late Pleistocene "Beringia" between Siberia and Alaska during the Last Glacial Maximum (Late Weichselian Epoch). These islands represent the remains of about 1.6 million square kilometers of the formerly subaerial Great Arctic Plain that now lies submerged below parts of the Arctic Ocean, East Siberian Sea, and Laptev Sea. At this plain's greatest extent, sea level was 100–120 m below modern sea-level and the coastline lay 700 to 1000 kilometers north of its current position. This plain did not undergo extensive glaciation during the Late Pleistocene or the Last Glacial Maximum because it lay in the rain shadow of the Northern European ice sheet. During the frigid polar climate of the Last Glacial Maximum, 17,000 to 24,000 BC, small passive ice caps formed on the adjacent De Long Islands. Fragments of these ice caps remain on Jeannette, Henrietta, and Bennett Islands. Traces of former small slope and cirque glaciers in the form of buried ground ice deposits are preserved on Zhokhov Island. The sea submerged the Great Arctic Plain (except for the New Siberian and other isolated islands) within a relatively short time span of 7,000 years during the Early–Middle Holocene.

Geology
As noted by Digby and numerous later publications, this archipelago consists of a mixture of folded and faulted sedimentary and igneous rocks ranging in age from Precambrian to Pliocene. The Lyakhovsky Islands consist of a folded and faulted assemblage of Precambrian metamorphic rocks; upper Paleozoic to Triassic sandstones and shales; Jurassic to lower Cretaceous turbidites; Cretaceous granites; and ophiolites. The Anzhu Islands consist of a highly faulted and folded assemblage of Ordovician to Devonian limestones, dolomites, sandstones, shales, volcanoclastic strata, and igneous rocks; upper Paleozoic to Triassic sandstones and shales; Jurassic to lower Cretaceous turbidites; and upper Cretaceous to Pliocene sandstones and shales. The De Long Islands consist of early Paleozoic, middle Paleozoic, Cretaceous, and Neogene sedimentary and igneous (mostly basalt) rocks.

Digby also noted that some early papers published about the New Siberian Islands incorrectly describe them, often along with other Arctic islands (e.g. Wrangel Island), as being made either up almost entirely of mammoth bones and tusks or of ice, sand, and the bones of mammoths and other extinct megafauna. Some of these papers were written by persons (e.g. D. Gath Whitley) who had never visited the New Siberian Islands and relied upon anecdotes of traders and travelers and local folklore for their descriptions of them, and other articles were written by explorers and ivory hunters untrained in either geology or other sciences. Such statements have been shown to be fictional in nature by detailed studies of the geology of the New Siberian Islands by professional geologists, paleontologists, and other scientists.

Ivory deposits
As noted by Baron Eduard V. Toll in his account of the New Siberian Islands, sizeable and economically significant accumulations of fossil ivory occur within them. The ivory, along with mammoth and other bones, are found in recent beaches, drainage areas, river terraces and river beds. The New Siberian Islands are unique in the burial and preservation of fossil ivory "in such a wonderful state of preservation that the tusks so found cannot be distinguished from the very best and purest ivory".

The abundant bones, even skeletons, of mammoth, rhinoceros, musk-ox, and other megafauna along with the mammoth ivory found in these islands are preserved by permafrost, in which they are encased. The permafrost periodically developed in Late Pleistocene loess, solifluction, pond, and stream sediments as they accumulated. The radiocarbon dating of bones, ivory, and plants, optically stimulated luminescence dating of enclosing sediments, and uranium-thorium dating of associated peats demonstrate that they accumulated over a period of some 200,000 years. Radiocarbon dates obtained from the collagen of 87 mammoth tusks and bones collected from Faddeevsky, Kotelniy, and New Siberia islands ranged from 9470±40 BP to greater than 50,000 BP (14C).

Important Bird Area
The entire archipelago has been designated an Important Bird Area (IBA) by BirdLife International because it supports breeding populations of many species of birds.

Climate
The climate is arctic and severe. Snow cover is present for 9 months of the year.
 Average temperature in January: −28 °C to −31 °C
 Temperature in July: At the coasts icy Arctic water keeps the temperatures relatively low. Average maximum temperatures from +8 °C to +11 °C and average minimum temperatures from -3 °C to +1 °C. In the interior of the islands the average maximum temperatures in July are +16 °C to +19 °C and average minimum temperatures +3 °C to +6 °C.
 Precipitation: up to 132 mm a year

Permafrost and underground ice are very common. The surface of the islands is covered with Arctic tundra vegetation and numerous lakes.

The ocean surrounding the islands is covered with ice most of the year. During warm years, the ocean briefly opens for navigation July through October. During cold years, islands may remain ice-locked through the summer.

Polar night conditions are present November through February, and, conversely, the Sun remains above the horizon continuously during summer months.

Photo gallery

See also

 Arctic Alaska-Chukotka terrane
 Lomonosov Ridge
 List of islands
 Kigilyakh

References

 Locations

Further reading
 Alfred Wegner institute (AWI) Publications, Berichte zur Polar- und Meeresforschung (Reports on polar and marine research) - free, downloadable research reports on the biology, geology, oceanography, hydrology, paleontology, paleoclimatology, fauna, flora, soils, cryology, and so forth of the New Siberian Islands, Laptev Sea, and other parts of the Arctic Circle.
 Andreev, A.A., and D.M. Peteet, 1999, Climate and Diet of Mammoths in the East Siberian Arctic . Science Briefs (August 1999). Goddard Institute for Space Studies, New York, New York. Last visited July 12, 2008.
 Babinski, E.T., nd, A Frozen Ninety Foot Tall Plum Tree. examination of reports of a 90-foot fossil plum tree being found in Great Lyakhovsky Island of the New Siberian Islands.
 Basilyan, A., and P.A. Nikolskiy, 2002, Quaternary Deposits of New Siberia Island (Russian Arctic). 32nd Annual Arctic Workshop Abstracts, March 14–16, 2002, INSTAAR, University of Colorado at Boulder.
 Espinoza, E.O., and M.-J. Mann, 1993, The history and significance of the Schreger Pattern in Proboscidean ivory characterization. Journal for the American Institute for Conservation. vol. 32, no. 3, Article 3, pp. 241–248.
 
 Kuznetsova, T.V., L.D. Sulerzhitsky, Ch. Siegert, 2001, New data on the "Mammoth" fauna of the Laptev Shelf Land (East Siberian Arctic), 144 KB PDF file, The World of Elephants - International Congress, Rome 2001. Consiglio Nazionale delle Ricerche, Centro di Studio per il Quaternario e l'Evoluzione Ambientale, Università di Roma, Roma, Italy.

External links

  - aerial photographs of these islands.
 Location of Nanosnyy

 
Archipelagoes of the East Siberian Sea
Archipelagoes of the Laptev Sea
Archipelagoes of the Sakha Republic
Ecoregions of Russia
Islands of Siberia
Palearctic ecoregions
Tundra ecoregions
Uninhabited islands of Russia
Important Bird Areas of Russia
Important Bird Areas of Arctic islands